Mogrus cognatus is a species of jumping spider in the genus Mogrus that lives in Yemen. The male was first described in 1994.

References

Salticidae
Spiders described in 1994
Spiders of the Arabian Peninsula
Taxa named by Wanda Wesołowska